Belew is a surname. Notable people with this surname include:

Adrian Belew (born 1949), American rock musician
Bill Belew (1931–2008), American costume designer
Carl Belew (1931–1990), American country singer-songwriter
Cody Belew, contestant on The Voice (U.S. season 3)
David Owen Belew Jr. (1920–2001), American District Court judge
Kathleen Belew, an assistant professor of history at the University of Chicago, who is said to be an expert on the white-power movement
Ruth O'Neal Belew, (died 1973), American illustrator

See also
Ballew
Ballou
Bellew